"Hasta la vista, baby" is a catchphrase associated with Arnold Schwarzenegger's title character from the 1991 science fiction action film Terminator 2: Judgment Day.

Origin and use
The term "Hasta la vista", literally "Until the view", is a Spanish farewell that can generally be understood as meaning "Until the (next) time we see each other" or "See you later" or "Goodbye". In 1970, Bob Hope comically delivered the "Hasta la vista, baby" saying to Raquel Welch in the beginning of their "Rocky Racoon" tribute on Raquel Welch's special Raquel.  This term, with the added word "baby"—"Hasta la vista, baby"—was later used in a popular hit song from 1987, "Looking for a New Love" by Grammy Award winner Jody Watley. It was also used in the 1988 Tone Lōc single "Wild Thing".

The phrase became a famous catchphrase when it was used in the 1991 film Terminator 2: Judgment Day. The phrase is featured in an exchange between the film's characters John Connor (Edward Furlong) and The Terminator (Arnold Schwarzenegger), where the former teaches the latter the use of slang:
John Connor: No, no, no, no. You gotta listen to the way people talk. You don't say "affirmative" or some shit like that. You say "no problemo". And if someone comes up to you with an attitude, you say "eat me". And if you want to shine them on, it's "hasta la vista, baby".
T-800: Hasta la vista, baby.

The phrase is once again uttered in the 2003 film Terminator 3: Rise of the Machines, by John Connor.

See also

Hasta la Vista Baby! U2 Live in Mexico City, U2's 1997 live album
Hasta la Vista, Baby!, a 1998 album from Skin
"Hasta la Vista", Belarus's 2008 Eurovision entry by Ruslan Alekhno
"Hasta la vista", Serbia's 2020 Eurovision entry by Hurricane
 I'll be back – Another Schwarzenegger catchphrase from The Terminator.

References

Arnold Schwarzenegger
English phrases
Catchphrases
Science fiction catchphrases
Quotations from film
1991 neologisms
Terminator (franchise)